The Hawthorne Place District is a historic district in Chicago, Illinois, United States.  The district was built in the 1890s by various architects including the McConnell brothers, Burnham & Root, and Pond & Pond. It was designated a Chicago Landmark on March 26, 1996.

References

1890s architecture in the United States
Historic districts in Chicago
Chicago Landmarks